There are at least 5 named lakes and reservoirs in Montgomery County, Arkansas.

Lakes
According to the United States Geological Survey, there are no named lakes in Montgomery County, Arkansas.

Reservoirs
	Hatfield Lake, el.  
	Lake Ouachita, el.  
	Lake Ouachita Nursery Pond, el.  
	North Fork Lake, el.  
	Tigue Lake, el.

See also

 List of lakes in Arkansas

Notes

Bodies of water of Montgomery County, Arkansas
Montgomery